Snehangshu Kanta Acharya, Bar at Law (1 September 1913 – 27 August 1986) was an Advocate General of West Bengal, India and a political leader.

Background and education
He was the son of the Sashi Kanta Acharya Chaudhuri, a former Maharaja of Mymensingh, a premier zamindar in Bengal. The Maharajas of Mymensingh were the wealthiest and senior most zamindars of the district of Mymensingh and ranked high in the order of precedence in the Government House in Calcutta. Mymensingh was the predecessor estate of most other zamindaris of the district. He studied at Scottish Church College, and later at the University of Calcutta. He was called to the Bar by the Honourable Society of Grey's Inn in London.

Family
His wife, Supriya Acharya (Mukhopadhyaya), daughter of Bengali writer Sourindra Mohan Mukhopadhyaya was also an active member of Communist Party of India (Marxist). His son, Sourangshu Kanta Acharya, is a doctor and his daughter, Bijoya Goswami, is a Sanskrit scholar. Famous singer Suchitra Mitra was his sister-in law.

Political career
He was a member of the Indian Students Group Movement, during the freedom struggle. This movement was formed in support of Socialist (Marxist) ideology, to protest against colonial rule of India and to counteract fascism. He worked as rescue volunteer in the time of 1946 riot in Kolkata before joining the Communist Party of India. He was closely associated with the former chief minister of West Bengal, Jyoti Basu. He had received the First Order of Merit of Syria in 1957 and had led several delegations to Europe, Asia and Africa. Acharya served as the Advocate General of West Bengal in two terms from 1969 to 1970 and 1977 to 1986.

Memoirs 
A law college, Snahanshu Kanta Acharya Institute of Law (SKAIL) was established in his name under University of Kalyani. It is situated in the university campus.

See also
 Major Zamindars of Mymensingh

References

External links
 Article about secret meetings at Acharya's house
 Report on Third General Election, 1962. Page 158
 

Scottish Church College alumni
Bengali zamindars
20th-century Bengalis
Indian barristers
Communist Party of India (Marxist) politicians from West Bengal
University of Calcutta alumni
20th-century Indian lawyers
People from Mymensingh District
20th-century Bangladeshi lawyers
1913 births
1986 deaths
Members of Gray's Inn